Bill Stevenson may refer to:

Bill Stevenson (businessman), American businessman, first husband of Jill Biden
Bill Stevenson (musician) (born 1963), American musician and record producer, associated with The Descendents and Black Flag
Bill Stevenson (Canadian musician) (born 1947), Canadian blues and jazz pianist, vocalist and songwriter, originally associated with Earth Opera
Bill Stevenson (offensive lineman) (1951–2007), Canadian football player
Bill Stevenson (quarterback) (born 1933), Canadian football player

See also
Bill Stephenson (1937–2010), Australian rules footballer
William Stevenson (disambiguation) 
William Stephenson (disambiguation)